Common names: Thorn tail snakes.

Platyplectrurus is a genus of nonvenomous shield tail snakes endemic to the Western Ghats of India. Currently, 2 species are recognized.

Geographic range
Found in the Western Ghats of South India. Found in high elevation (> 1200 m asl) montane Shola forests, under rocks, fallen logs and in piles of debris.

Species

*) Not including the nominate subspecies.
T) Type species.

References

External links
 

Uropeltidae
Snake genera
Taxa named by Albert Günther